Trans O'Higgins is a public transport system that serves Rancagua, the capital of O'Higgins Region.

The system was introduced on October 25, 2004, having 19 lines on the Rancagua conurbation and surrounding areas.

Details

The city transport comprise buses commonly called micros. The increased transport park consists mostly of medium capacity light microbuses.

Since the implementation of the transport plan Trans O'Higgins in 2004, it became a division of the types of transport: the red buses that are urban travel and green buses that are of rural type. The green buses are the mainstay of transport with the communes that make up the Rancagua conurbation.

Rancagua

In Rancagua are six bus lines that run through each one of the sectors of the city (Circunvalación, Isabel Riquelme, Cachapoal, Manzanal, Buses 25 and Oriente-Poniente). All these buses are colored red, and bus routes differ in the top of the windshield with different colors.

Surrounding areas

In rural areas near Rancagua are thirteen bus lines that run through each one of the sectors in the O'Higgins Region (San Francisco-Rancagua, Graneros-Rancagua, Oriente-Norte, Machalí-Rancagua, Coya-Rancagua, Vía Rural 5 Sur Quinta de Tilcoco, Vía Rural 5 Sur San Vicente de Tagua Tagua, Vía Rural 5 Sur San Fernando, Coinco-Rancagua, Olivar-Rancagua, Sextur - Lago Rapel, Las Cabras-Rancagua and Red Norte). All these buses are green, and bus routes differ in the top of the windshield with different colors. These buses start their trips from the Teminal Rodoviario located in the street Doctor José Antonio Salinas in Rancagua.

References

Rancagua
Public transport in Chile
2004 establishments in Chile